The One of a Kind World Tour was the first headlining concert tour by South Korean singer and rapper G-Dragon, in support of his first EP One of a Kind (2012). The tour visited 9 countries and 13 cities in 2013, gathering a total of 570,000 fans, making it the most attended concert tour in history by a Korean solo artist.

Background
On January 14, 2013, YG Entertainment announced that G-Dragon will hold his first world tour, and his first solo concert since 2009. The production of the tour costed $3.5 Million, making it the largest scale in Korean history. The tour was jointly directed by choreographers Travis Payne and Stacy Walker who previously worked on Michael Jackson′s This Is It tour. The stage was designed by Michael Cotten, who has decorated the stages of the Super Bowl, the Olympics and Michael Jackson′s world tour.

Reception
Billboard claimed that G-Dragon was a "highly-energetic performer" and was pushing boundaries with this tour, which was described as "vibrant" and an "Michael Jackson-level affair". KpopStarz called the concert "spectacular", praised the diversity of the show and said that G-Dragon "can create his own 'bang' on the stage.". MWave stated that G-Dragon showed that he's indeed one of a kind while "he burst forth in his own style and personality all throughout the concert." The critic concluded that the rapper "filled every corner of the stage perfectly with his solo presence." MeRadio highlighted the "great selection of songs and the way they were arranged", the laser effects, pyrotechnics, holograms, and the singer's charisma and stage presence as the reasons why the concert was entertaining.  In Japan, G-Dragon became the first Korean solo artist to hold concerts at four dome-arenas.

Special guests
Big Bang
Taeyang
T.O.P
Seungri
Daesung
2NE1
CL (singer)
Tablo
Lee Hi

Set list

Tour dates

References

External links
Official Site
YG Entertainment
Big Bang Japan Official Site

2013 concert tours
BigBang (South Korean band) concert tours
G-Dragon
Concert tours of Asia
Concert tours of Japan